Swab Phaoprathan, also known as Sawab Khan Pathan or Tawab Khan, is a Thai businessman and politician of Pashtun Pakistani ancestry. He became a member of the House of Representatives in January 2020 as a party-list candidate for Bhumjaithai Party, following the death of Chai Chidchob.

Khan was born to a Thai family of Pakistani ancestry whose family migrated from Muhibullah Banda village in Adina, Swabi District. He is fluent in Pashto language. His father, Abdul Wahab, was a soldier in British Indian Army.

Previously, he has served as a special representative of the Thai king for the Muslim community in Thailand.

References

Swab Phaoprathan
Swab Phaoprathan
Swab Phaoprathan
Swab Phaoprathan
Living people
Swab Phaoprathan
Year of birth missing (living people)